The 2023 Valencian regional election will be held on Sunday, 28 May 2023, to elect the 11th Corts of the Valencian Community. All 99 seats in the Corts will be up for election. The election will be held simultaneously with regional elections in eleven other autonomous communities and local elections all throughout Spain.

The ruling "Botànic Agreement" of left-of-centre parties was re-elected in the 2019 election for a second term in office, albeit with a diminished majority of 52 to 47. Opinion polls held in the ensuing years saw a collapse of the vote for Citizens (Cs), particularly following the 2021 Madrilenian election, and its capitalization by both the People's Party (PP) and the far-right Vox party, to the point of putting at risk a new Botànic majority. The coalition government was further weakened by the resignation in June 2022 of Compromís figurehead Mónica Oltra as both cabinet member and deputy, following her being accused of negligence and concealment in an alleged case of sexual abuse of a minor under the protection of her ministry by her ex-husband. On the other hand, Puig's government was generally well-valued in opinion polls for its management of the COVID-19 pandemic, the economy and the political situation in the Valencian Community, which during this period saw the organization of the Benidorm Fest, the signing of a collaboration agreement with the Volkswagen Group for the development of a battery gigafactory in Sagunt and Ford's decision to equip its plant in Almussafes with the manufacture of electric cars.

Overview

Electoral system
The Corts Valencianes are the devolved, unicameral legislature of the Valencian autonomous community, having legislative power in regional matters as defined by the Spanish Constitution and the Valencian Statute of Autonomy, as well as the ability to vote confidence in or withdraw it from a regional president.

Voting for the Corts is on the basis of universal suffrage, which comprises all nationals over 18 years of age, registered in the Valencian Community and in full enjoyment of their political rights. The "begged" or expat vote system, requiring Valencians abroad to apply for voting before being permitted to vote, was repealed in 2022. The 99 members of the Corts Valencianes are elected using the D'Hondt method and a closed list proportional representation, with a threshold of five percent of valid votes—which includes blank ballots—being applied regionally. Parties not reaching the threshold are not taken into consideration for seat distribution. Seats are allocated to constituencies, corresponding to the provinces of Alicante, Castellón and Valencia, with each being allocated an initial minimum of 20 seats and the remaining 39 being distributed in proportion to their populations (provided that the seat-to-population ratio in any given province did not exceed three times that of any other).

As a result of the aforementioned allocation, each constituency is provisionally entitled to the following seats for the 2023 regional election:

Election date
The term of the Corts Valencianes expires four years after the date of their previous election, unless they are dissolved earlier. The election decree shall be issued no later than the twenty-fifth day prior to the date of expiry of parliament and published on the following day in the Official Journal of the Valencian Government (DOGV), with election day taking place on the fifty-fourth day from publication. The previous election was held on 28 April 2019, which means that the legislature's term will expire on 28 April 2023. The election decree must be published in the DOGV no later than 4 April 2023, with the election taking place on the fifty-fourth day from publication, setting the latest possible election date for the Corts on Sunday, 28 May 2023.

The president has the prerogative to dissolve the Corts Valencianes and call a snap election, provided that no motion of no confidence is in process. In the event of an investiture process failing to elect a regional president within a two-month period from the first ballot, the Corts are to be automatically dissolved and a fresh election called.

By late 2021, speculation emerged on possible snap elections in Andalusia and Castile and León to be held at some point during the spring of 2022, with it transpiring that President Ximo Puig was evaluating the opportunity of an early election in the Valencian Community to be held simultaneously with those. However, Puig publicly and repeatedly rejected the idea of a snap election being held, an opinion he reiterated following the announcement of an election in Castile and León for 13 February 2022, and after the calling of the 2022 Andalusian election for 19 June. On 25 December 2022, Puig confirmed the election would be held in May together with the scheduled local and regional elections.

Parliamentary composition
The table below shows the composition of the parliamentary groups in the Corts at the present time.

Parties and candidates
The electoral law allows for parties and federations registered in the interior ministry, coalitions and groupings of electors to present lists of candidates. Parties and federations intending to form a coalition ahead of an election are required to inform the relevant Electoral Commission within ten days of the election call, whereas groupings of electors need to secure the signature of at least one percent of the electorate in the constituencies for which they seek election, disallowing electors from signing for more than one list of candidates.

Below is a list of the main parties and electoral alliances which will likely contest the election:

Opinion polls
The tables below list opinion polling results in reverse chronological order, showing the most recent first and using the dates when the survey fieldwork was done, as opposed to the date of publication. Where the fieldwork dates are unknown, the date of publication is given instead. The highest percentage figure in each polling survey is displayed with its background shaded in the leading party's colour. If a tie ensues, this is applied to the figures with the highest percentages. The "Lead" column on the right shows the percentage-point difference between the parties with the highest percentages in a poll.

Graphical summary

Voting intention estimates
The table below lists weighted voting intention estimates. Refusals are generally excluded from the party vote percentages, while question wording and the treatment of "don't know" responses and those not intending to vote may vary between polling organisations. When available, seat projections determined by the polling organisations are displayed below (or in place of) the percentages in a smaller font; 50 seats are required for an absolute majority in the Corts Valencianes.

Voting preferences
The table below lists raw, unweighted voting preferences.

Victory preferences
The table below lists opinion polling on the victory preferences for each party in the event of a general election taking place.

Preferred President
The table below lists opinion polling on leader preferences to become president of the Valencian Government.

Predicted President
The table below lists opinion polling on the perceived likelihood for each leader to become president.

Results

Overall

Notes

References
Opinion poll sources

Other

2020s
Valencian Community
2023 regional elections in Spain